The Asia/Oceania Zone was one of three zones of regional competition in the 2006 Davis Cup.

Group I

Group II

Lebanon and Malaysia relegated to Group III in 2007.
Kazakhstan promoted to Group I in 2007.

Group III
Venue: Manila Polo Club, Makati, Manila, Philippines (clay)
Date: 19–23 July

(scores in italics carried over from Groups)

Philippines and Iran promoted to Group II in 2007.
Bahrain and Bangladesh relegated to Group IV in 2007.

Group IV
Venue: Al Hussein Tennis Club, Amman, Jordan (hard)
Date: 5–9 April

Oman and United Arab Emirates promoted to Group III in 2007.

See also
Davis Cup structure

 
Asia
Davis Cup Asia/Oceania Zone